Linda Goodnight is an American author of inspirational romance, contemporary romance and women's fiction. In 2008, she received the Romance Writers of America RITA Award for Best Inspirational Romance for her novel A Touch of Grace.

Biography
Goodnight grew up in Prague, Oklahoma and was an avid reader, but didn't consider writing fiction a career until her former neighbor Sharon Sala began publishing romance novels. She started writing while raising a family and working full-time as a nurse. After working as a nurse for fourteen years, Goodnight became a teacher in a small rural school in 1985. In 1995, she was named "teacher of the year" by her colleagues. It was at this time that she decided to get serious about her writing and completed a novel. Twelve years later, she retired from teaching to write full-time.

She married her husband Gene when they were in their twenties, and he brought three children to the marriage. They went on to have three children of their own, and as they were set to retire, adopted from Ukraine in 2008 and 2009. She is also active in orphan ministry. They live outside Seminole, Oklahoma.

She cites Gone With the Wind as another inspiration as she kept rewriting the ending. "Clearly, I was meant to write books with happy endings...and so I do."

Her first published writing appeared in an anthology called Prairie Brides in 2000 for Barbour. She was picked up by Silhouette in 2002 for her novels. In 2015, she departed from romance to women's fiction with the publication of The Memory House.

Awards and reception

 2007 - Romantic Times Reviewers Choice Award for Steeple Hill Love Inspired for The Heart of Grace
 2008 - Romance Writers of America RITA Award for Best Inspirational Romance for A Touch of Grace

She has also finaled four times in the RITA Award, won Booksellers' Best and ACFW Book of the Year.

Romantic Times Book Review gave A Touch of Grace 4.5 stars and a Top Pick, saying, "From its sad, touching beginning to an equally moving conclusion, [it] will keep you riveted."

Out of thirty-seven books reviewed on Romantic Times Book Review, thirty-one are 4 stars and above, but her only 2 star was for Cowboy Daddy, Jingle-Bell Baby which they said "The characters have excellent chemistry, but they're both stereotypes -- and the plot is crippled by multiple cliches."

RITA-nominated The Christmas Child received a B+ from guest reviewer Silver James on Smart Bitches Trashy Books, saying "a sweet romance with very real emotions and...funny secondary characters." However, for her RITA-nominated book, The Wedding Garden, a different reviewer at Smart Bitches gave it a DNF (Did Not Finish): "I really wanted to like The Wedding Garden and Linda Goodnight is a solid writer, but I haven’t been able to finish the book...[T]here are too many frustrating wave-my-hands-in-the-air moments, mostly having to do with the secret baby plot line and the hero and heroine’s too-simplistic internal conflicts." Romantic Times, however, gave it 4 stars, calling it, "a tender tale of love lost and found, with a mystery solved and loved ones laid to rest."

On November 18, 2013, The Gift of Christmas hit #1 on Publishers Weekly's Mass Market bestsellers list, remaining on the list for at least nine weeks.

Romantic Times Book Review called The Memory House "...a tender story about love, loss, healing and redemption." Bookreporter's review stated that she "weaves a story of wounded souls who come into each other’s orbits to help each other heal." Jayne at Dear Author gave it a B− saying, "This is a story of painful emotions, loss, grief, love and redemption. It’s loaded with angst but it’s quiet, smoldering angst not in-your-face, slap you upside the head angst."

Bibliography

The Brothers' Bond

The Buchanons

A Honey Ridge Novel

Redemption River

The Rocky Mountain Heirs

Whisper Falls

Stand-alone works

Anthologies and short stories
  in Prairie Brides
  in Lessons of the Heart
  in Love Afloat
  in Cowboy Christmas
  in A Bride By Christmas
  in Mothers and Daughters
  in A Snowglobe Christmas
  in First Kisses

References

External links 
 Author's Blog
 Author's Website
 Official Page at Harlequin

Living people
American romantic fiction writers
RITA Award winners
Year of birth missing (living people)
21st-century American novelists
American women novelists
Women romantic fiction writers
Novelists from Oklahoma
21st-century American women writers
People from Seminole, Oklahoma